Alan Cowey FMedSci, FRS (28 April 1935 – 19 December 2012) was a British scientist and academic, and the Emeritus Professor of Physiological Psychology at the University of Oxford. His primary interest was in the way in which we interpret the visual world. He gained a BA from the University of Cambridge in 1957 and a PhD from Cambridge in 1961. He was elected a Fellow of the Royal Society in 1988, and a Fellow of the Academy of Medical Sciences in 1998. In 2000 he received an honorary DSc from the University of Durham, and in 2007 he presented the Royal Society's Ferrier Lecture.

References

Alumni of Emmanuel College, Cambridge
British neuroscientists
Fellows of Lincoln College, Oxford
Fellows of the Academy of Medical Sciences (United Kingdom)
Fellows of the Royal Society
People educated at Bede Grammar School for Boys
1935 births
2012 deaths